E 008 is a European B class road in Tajikistan, connecting the cities Dushanbe - Kulob - Kalaikhumb - Khorugh – Murghab - Kulma - border of China.

Route

 РБ04 Road: Dushanbe - Vahdat - Kulob - Khorugh (E 009) - Murghob - Kulma - Border of China

Lack of signage 
E 008 has never been signposted on any direction sign and it remains signed only as РБ04, as Tajikistani authorities never implemented any European route number signage. While Turkey, Kazakhstan and Russia signpost European route numbers, this is not the case in many Asian countries, including Tajikistan.

References

External links 
 UN Economic Commission for Europe: Overall Map of E-road Network (2007)

International E-road network
Roads in Tajikistan